Cecal artery, caecal artery or arteria caecalis can refer to:
 Anterior cecal artery (arteria caecalis anterior)
 Posterior cecal artery (arteria caecalis posterior)